The World of Vog Mur is a 1984 fantasy role-playing game supplement published by Iron Crown Enterprises for the Rolemaster role-playing game.

Contents
The World of Vog Mur is a campaign setting which consists of three small islands, only the largest of which is inhabited.

Reception
Jeff Ong reviewed The World of Vog Mur in Space Gamer No. 72. Ong commented that "World of Vog Mur will keep a group occupied for months of real time. Even if used only to add a little color to a campaign, it is definitely worth its [...] price."

References

Role-playing game supplements introduced in 1984
Rolemaster supplements